

There are 167 Sites of Special Scientific Interest (SSSIs) in Cornwall (including the Isles of Scilly). The north coast of Cornwall falls on the Celtic Sea in the Atlantic Ocean, which also surrounds the Isles of Scilly, the south coast falls on the English Channel and the county is bounded by the River Tamar, forming the border with Devon, to the east. Cornish geology consists mainly of rocks from the Devonian and Carboniferous geological periods. Granite forms a large part of these, with mineralisations of tin, copper, lead and arsenic having been mined in the area. This gives rise to many distinct habitats, with strong marine influences, including sand dunes, rocky reefs, stacks and headlands as well as heathland, moorland and unusual river profiles.

In England the body responsible for designating SSSIs is Natural England, which chooses a site "because of its flora, fauna, or geological or physiographical features". Natural England took over the role of designating and managing SSSIs from English Nature in October 2006 when it was formed from the amalgamation of English Nature, parts of the Countryside Agency and the Rural Development Service. Natural England, like its predecessor, uses the 1974–96 county system and as such the same approach is followed here, rather than adopting the current local government or ceremonial county boundaries.

Of the 167 sites designated in this Area of Search, the greatest number, 81, have been designated due to their biological interest, with 54 due to their geological interest and 32 for both. The data in the table is taken from English Nature in the form of citation sheets for each SSSI.

Sites

See also

 List of Sites of Special Scientific Interest by Area of Search
 List of Special Areas of Conservation in Cornwall

Notes
Reason for designation; either for the site's biological interest, or its geological interest.
Data rounded to one decimal place.
Grid reference is based on the British national grid reference system, also known as OSGB36, and is the system used by the Ordnance Survey.
Link to maps using the Nature on the Map service provided by Natural England.

References

 
Cornwall
Sites of Special Scientific Interest